The Morishita's tiger (Parantica hypowattan) is a species of butterfly in the family Danaidae. It is endemic to Sulawesi, Indonesia.

References

Parantica
Butterflies of Indonesia
Endemic fauna of Indonesia
Fauna of Sulawesi
Taxonomy articles created by Polbot
Butterflies described in 1981